The ICRC is the International Committee of the Red Cross.

ICRC may also refer to:
Interface Cyclic Redundancy Check
International Clinical Research Center in Brno, Czech Republic
International Conference of Reformed Churches
International Cosmic Ray Conference
International Classic Record Collector, a magazine founded in 1995